The 602 Commando Company is a special operations unit of the Argentine Army.

Unit insignia
The members of the unit wear green berets with unit badges. The company is divided into three assault sections.

History
Today's unit was created 21 May 1982.

Falklands War
The unit had its baptism of fire in the Falklands War. The commander of the company was 39-year-old Major Aldo Rico.

On the night of 29–30 May, Captain Andres Antonio Ferrero's 3rd Assault Section attempted to seize Mount Kent but was beaten back in an SAS ambush from 16 Air Troop, although wounding two SAS men (Dick Palmer and Carl Rhodes) in the process.

On the morning of 30 May, Captain Tomas Victor Fernandez's 2nd Assault Section from 602 Commando Company suffered two killed on Bluff Cove Peak during the Mount Kent Skirmish, First Lieutenant Rubén Eduardo Márquez and Sergeant Oscar Humberto Blas, in an action with 17 Boat Troop and Major Cedric Delves' Tactical Headquarters (including part of the Intelligence Corps) from the British 22nd Special Air Service. First Lieutenant Márquez and Sergeant Blas showed great personal courage and leadership in the action and were subsequently awarded the Argentine Nation to the Valour in Combat Medal. During this contact the SAS suffered two more casualties (Ewen Pearcy and Don Masters) from grenades (including an Intelligence NCO assigned to the SAS). The Argentine Commandos literally stumbled on a camp occupied by 15 SAS troopers. That night, Captain Peter Babbington's K Company of 42 Commando, Royal Marines and 7 'Sphinx' Battery from the Royal Artillery arrived nearby via helicopters. At about the same time, the 2nd Assault Section, having hidden all day, emerged from their hides intending to withdraw from the area but came under prompt and heavy fire from the SAS in the form of Mountain Troop and lost one NCO (Sergeant Vicente Alfredo Flores) captured. The SAS claim on their part, to have come under mortar bombardment while evacuating their wounded. The British artillery battery report the loss of one gunner (Van Rooyen) who suffered a broken arm while taking cover among the slippery rocks in the bombardment.

During the Argentine retreat from the Mount Kent area on 30 May, Sergeant Mario Antonio Cisnerofrom 602 Commando Company ―armed with a 7.62 mm machinegun― and Sergeant Luis Alberto Kovalskifrom 601 National Gendarmerie Special Forces Squadron (also armed with a machinegun) repeatedly fired at low flying Royal Air Force fighter-bombers conducting strafing runs with the British reporting the loss of one GR-3 Harrier (Harrier XZ 963, piloted by Squadron-Leader Jerry Pook) to small-arms fire.

The 1st Assault Section fought in the Battle of Top Malo House on 31 May 1982. In an action lasting 45 minutes, the Argentine Army Special Forces patrol under Captain José Arnobio Vercesi was defeated and the survivors captured in the encounter with the British Mountain and Arctic Warfare Cadre, a Royal Marines unit, attached to the 3 Commando Brigade that reported 3 British badly wounded in the gun-battle. Another British Marine (Sergeant McClean) suffered bone bruising when hit in the hand while attempting to fire a 66mm anti-tank rocket.

On the night of 5–6 June Captain Andres Ferrero's 3rd Assault Section dislodged a platoon of Royal Marines in the form of Lieutenant Tony Hornby's 10 Troop, 42 Commando from Mount Wall that had been calling down softening up fire on the Mount Harriet defenders. According to Ferrero:

On 8 June, Private 1st Class Argentino Foremny of the 602 Commando Company Blowpipe Team that Major Rico had sent forward to Mount Harriet, with the help of the built-in zoom-in sight of his man-portable surface-to-air missile launcher, confirmed the presence of the British troopships Sir Galahad and Sir Tristram at Port Pleasant:

Captain Ferrero's 3rd Assault Section suffered one killed (Sergeant Mario Antonio Cisnero) and one wounded (First Lieutenant Jorge Manuel Vizoso-Posse) while Captain Eduardo Miguel Santo's supporting National Gendarmerie section suffered another dead (Sergeant Ramon Acosta) and another wounded (Sergeant Pablo Daniel Parada) in a fierce action near Murrell River on the night of 9/10 June, seizing much equipment and forcing the attacking Royal Marines platoon to withdraw, with Major Rico belatedly calling down fire support from Lieutenant-Colonel Martin Balza's 3rd Artillery Group in an attempt to cut off the British escape route and take prisoners. 

In this action in the early hours of Thursday 10 June 1982, 50 Argentine Army and National Gendarmerie Commandos fought against a reinforced platoon of Royal Marines. One Royal Marine (Corporal Peter Fitton ) was reportedly killed by either friendly or defensive mortar fire in the action or in the approach to Murrell River.

According to the British military historian Bruce Quarrie, it was a hard-fought and costly action for both sides:

Captain Hugo Ranieri, armed with a .300 Weatherby Magnum bolt-action rifle, fought as a sniper in the gun-battle:

The next day, a 4th Regiment patrol under Subteniente Marcelo Llambías-Pravaz collected the British equipment abandoned in the action, and these were presented as war trophies to Argentine war correspondents in Port Stanley that filmed and photographed the equipment.

On the night of 12–13 June, Captain Andres Ferrero's 3rd Assault Section of 602 Commando Company took up ambush positions in the vicinity of Mount William, in support of the 5th Marine Infantry Battalion.

According to First Lieutenant Horacio Fernando Lauría, a judo-black-belt from Captain Ferrero's patrol:

21st century
The company is based in Córdoba Province and is under the command of the Rapid Deployment Force as part of the Special Operations Forces Group.

See also
Rapid Deployment Force (Argentina)
Special Operations Forces Group
601 Air Assault Regiment
601 Commando Company
Argentine Army

References

External links
https://web.archive.org/web/20071116154310/http://www.raf.mod.uk/falklands/mov1.html

Special forces of Argentina
Army units and formations of Argentina
Military units and formations established in 1982
Military units and formations of Argentina in the Falklands War
1982 establishments in Argentina